The mass media in Armenia refers to mass media outlets based in Armenia. Television, magazines, and newspapers are all operated by both state-owned and for-profit corporations which depend on advertising, subscription, and other sales-related revenues. Armenia's press freedoms improved considerably following 2018's Velvet Revolution.

The Constitution of Armenia guarantees freedom of speech, yet media freedom remains restricted, among threats of violence, strong political inferences, and expensive defamation lawsuits. Armenia ranks 51st in the 2022 Press Freedom Index report compiled by Reporters Without Borders, leading in the South Caucasus region, and ranking between Gambia and Suriname.

Legislative framework
Article 27 of the Constitution of Armenia guarantees freedom of speech and freedom of the press. The Constitution also guarantees the "Freedom of mass media and other means of mass information shall be guaranteed" and that "The state shall guarantee the existence and activities of an independent and public radio and television service.
Article 47 of the Constitution of Armenia prohibits incitement to national, racial and religious hatred, propaganda of violence. The Constitution also establishes the right to seek, receive, convey and disseminate information and provide foreigners with the same rights to information as citizens. Yet, law is most often unevenly applied or completely disapplicated.

Criminal liability for defamation was eliminated in 2010, but the civil code established high monetary penalties, up to 2,000 times the minimum salary.
A draft amendment that would make online media liable for defamatory comments was put forward in 2014; it was postponed sine die after domestic and international criticisms.

Specialized media laws include the Telecommunication Law and the Law on Television and Radio Broadcasting. The latter guarantees right to freedom of selection, production and broadcast of TV and radio programme and forbids censorship (Article 4). It also establishes the Public TV and Radio Company as a state enterprise with special status (Article 28); its management body is the Public TV Council, composed of 5 members appointed by the President. The same law establishes the National Commission of Television and Radio (NCTR) as an independent agency for the regulation of licensing and monitoring of private TV and radio companies (Article 37).

The 2010 new Law on Television and Radio was negatively assessed by the OSCE RFoM, as failing to promote media pluralism in the digital age, despite amendments. The shortcomings include "a limit to the number of broadcast channels; a lack of clear rules for the licensing of satellite, mobile telephone and online broadcasting; the placement of all forms of broadcasting under a regime of licensing or permission by the Regulator; the granting of authority to the courts to terminate broadcast licences based on provisions in the law that contain undue limitations on freedom of the media; and a lack of procedures and terms for the establishment of private digital channels."

A Freedom of information Law was passed in 2003. Yet, its implementation has stalled. 2014 amendments aimed at operationalise it, but to no avail yet. While courts have been responsive, government departments have declined access requests, and many Soviet-era files remain classified. 
Other relevant laws for the media sector include the Law on Advertising and the Law on Freedom of Information. The latter established the right to access public information and detailed the lawful limitations to such right (state, official, bank or trade secrets; privacy rights; pre-investigation data).

Broadcast media require licenses from the National Commission on Television and Radio (NCTR), which is composed of 8 members (4 appointed by the President, 4 by the Parliament) for a 6-years mandate. The licensing systems hinders media freedom and diversity. Print and online media are exempt from licenses.

There is no law exempting journalists from testimony or protecting their sources in Armenia.

In June 2014, a Yerevan court ruled against Hraparak and iLur.am, and in favour of Armenia's Special Investigation Service, establishing that publishing information on ongoing investigation without prior authorization is a criminal offense. The ruling was widely criticised.

Status and self-regulation of journalists
There is no specific Press Council in Armenia. Journalists and media outlets can be prosecuted in court, and have one month to explain errors and convince the court of its innocence.

Media outlets

TV is the main medium in Armenia, and most of its channels are controlled or friendly with the government, as broadcast media require a license. The print sector is small and in decline, while online media are rising. Russian-language media are widely available. Ownership of the media is often opaque. Public media outlets receive preferential treatment from the authorities, while private media are not financially sustainable and rely heavily on their owners and sponsors, hindering editorial independence.

News agencies

Armenpress is the only one state-owned news agency. There are eight private agencies: Shant, Noyan Tapan, Arminfo, Arka, Mediamax, PanArmenian, News-Armenia and Photolur.

Print media

In 2009, Armenia registered 747 newspapers and 328 magazines. All main press publications are politically affiliated, with negative consequences on editorial independence. Daily circulation numbers are very low, ranging between 1,500 and 3,000.

In the country's media landscape, the most popular daily newspapers include the leading liberal newspaper  Aravot (Morning), Haykakan zhamanak (Armenian Times), Hayastani Hanrapetutyun (Republic of Armenia) – the official gazette of the government, published since 1990 – and Azg (Nation). Periodicals published in Russian are also very popular in Armenia and include the newspaper Golos Armenii (Voice of Armenia), the weekly Novoe vremya (New Times) and Respublika Armenia (Republic of Armenia). Other noteworthy publications are the daily Jamanak (Times), which is published in Istanbul and Chorrord ishghanutyun (Forth authority), both considered opposition party newspapers.

As a consequence of the large Armenian diaspora living outside the country's territory, several Armenian newspapers in the Armenian language are published outside the country. English-language publications include Noyan Tapan.

During the Yerevan's Freedom Square' protests following the Armenian presidential election, 2008, the government introduced a 20-days "state of emergency". During this time most of the journals were forced to suspend publishing activities or report only official news.

Publishing

Radio broadcasting

As of 2008, Armenia has 9 am stations, 17 FM stations, and one shortwave station. Additionally, there are approximately 850,000 radios in existence.
Primary network provider is TRBNA.

The Public Radio of Armenia is the national public radio channel. Armenia has dozens of private radio stations, including Radio Ardzaganq, Radio Jazz, Radio Avrora, Radio Van, Nor (New) Radio, Radio Hay, City FM, AvtoRadio but they cover only part of the country. These broadcasts provide different kind of music: traditional one is offered by Radio Hay FM 104.1 MHz, the European, American and Russian pop music one by Radio Van FM 103.0 MHz, Radio Ardzaganq FM 103.5 MHz and  Radio Avrora FM 100.6 MHz, etc. and the classical one by Vem Radio FM 101.6 MHz. Usually, the used language is Armenian or Russian. FM-102.4 broadcast in French but other radios have programmes in German. Azatutyun  broadcasts news and analysis three times a day on the frequencies of Radio Yerevan FM 102.0.

Television broadcasting

Public television channels include Armenia 1 that began transmissions in 1956. According to the Television Association Committee of Armenia, the TV penetration rate in Armenia is 80% according to 2011 data. TV remains the main source of information for Armenian citizens.

Armenia has 48 private television stations alongside 2 public networks (National 1 (H1) and Ararat); private TV channels include Shant TV, Armenia, AR, Yerkir Media, Hayrenik (for children), H2 and Dar21. Major Russian channels (ORT and RTR with full retransmission, as well as Kultura and Mir) are widely available throughout the country; CNN (in English) and Euronews (in Russian) are the only foreign broadcasters covering Yerevan.
Cable TV has a limited range, while satellite TV is widespread in Yerevan. Three Armenian satellite channels – H1, Shant and Armenia – cater to Armenian communities in Europe and North America.
In the year 2008 TRBNA upgraded the main circuit to digital distribution system based on DVB-IP and MPEG2 standards.

TV channels lack economic sustainability, and their editorial independence is hindered by financial needs. They are often sponsored by political parties for propaganda purposes.

Televisions outlets must obtain licenses for operate from the (highly politicised) National Commission on Television and Radio (NCTR).
Other than the Gyumri-based GALA TV, virtually all Armenian TV stations, including the Yerevan-based national networks, are controlled by or loyal to the government. The only major private network that regularly aired criticism of the government (A1+) was controversially forced off the air in 2002, damaging pluralism in the Armenian media landscape and the country's international reputation. A1+ continued working as an internet-based news agency. Gala faced closure in 2015, being denied a digital TV license during the digitalisation switchover process.

In 2010, the Armenian government passed a set of controversial amendments to Armenian law on broadcasting that enables government regulators to grant or revoke licenses without explanation, as well as impose programming restrictions that would confine some stations to narrow themes such as culture, education, and sports. The Committee to Protect Journalists suggested that these amendments are primarily aimed at keeping the independent TV station A1+ off the air. It also pointed out that GALA TV, another, functioning independent broadcaster based in Gyumri, will be taken off the air in 2015 because of the amendments. Both A1+ and GALA TV failed to win new licenses in supposedly competitive tenders administered by the National Commission on Television and Radio in late 2010. The European Court of Human Rights ruled in 2008 that A1+'s licence was improperly revoked, but in 2014 the station had not been returned any licence. A1+ merely manages to broadcast a working-days news programme on Armnews frequencies.

Cinema 

Soviet Armenia (1924) was the first Armenian documentary film. Namus (1926) was the first Armenian silent black and white film, directed by Hamo Beknazarian and based on a play of Alexander Shirvanzade describing the ill fate of two lovers, who were engaged by their families to each other since childhood, but because of violations of namus (a tradition of honor), the girl was married by her father. In 1969, Sergei Parajanov created The Color of Pomegranates.

The "Golden Apricot" Yerevan International Film Festival (GAIFF) was established in 2004.

The Armenian Association of Film Critics and Cinema Journalists (AAFCCJ) gathers the workers in the mass media sector. It is a public NGO.

Telecommunications

As of June 2014, Armenia has 3.3 million mobile phone subscribers in total, and a 120% penetration rate.

There are three mobile phone operators currently in Armenia: Viva Cell MTS, Orange and Beeline. Orange and Beeline only offer 2G,3G and 4G LTE services. Viva Cell MTS offers both 2G and 3G as well as 4G services. All of them provide internet connection on mobile phones.

Internet

There are approximately 1,400,000 internet users and approximately 65,279 internet hosts in Armenia. The country code (Top level domain) for Armenia is .am, which has been used for AM radio stations and for domain hacks. Internet penetration reached 46% in 2014. Public wi-fi access points in parks and cafés in Yerevan have contributed to its growth.

Armentel's (the national communications company's) only fiber optic connection to the Internet enters Armenia through Georgia (via Marneuli) and then connects to the rest of the Internet via an undersea fiber-optic cable in the Black Sea. Armenia is connected to the Trans-Asia-Europe fiber-optic cable system via Georgia, which runs along the railroad from Poti to Tbilisi to the Armenian border near Marneuli. At Poti, the TAE cable connects to the undersea Georgia-Russia system KAFOS which then connects to the Black Sea Fiber Optic Cable System. The BSFOCS is co-owned by Armentel.

A major way of connecting to the Internet used to be dial-up. This was caused by very high prices of Internet access, and only very few people could use other types of connections until Beeline, Vivacell MTS and Orange started selling portable USB-modems. The average price for one hour of dial-up Internet access was about 48 cents, plus 20 cents for using phone line (summary 68 cents per hour).

As of March 2010, it is estimated that there are about 100,000 broadband subscribers in Armenia. DSL connectivity is offered by Beeline, Cornet, Arminco, and others.

 Cornet launched a nationwide WiMAX network in Yerevan and 18 biggest cities of Armenia. It uses 802.16e protocol in the 3.6–3.8 GHz frequency diapason. It provides 27 Mbit/sec speed.
 Armenian ISP Icon Communications has selected Alcatel-Lucent to design, deploy and maintain a commercial WiMAX 802.16e-2005 (Rev-e) network in Armenia.
Ucom telecom company has built up the first FTTH (Fiber to the home) Network in Armenia providing convergent Triple play services including Internet, IPTV and Digital Phone services.

Online media are growing. According to the local monitoring centre Circle.am (Rating and statistics for Armenian web resource) popular sites in Armenia include Hetq online, A1+ online, PanArmenian Network, News.am, Armenia Now, Armenia Today, Panorama.am, and Tert.am.

Media organisations

Trade unions 
Armenia's constitution recognises the right to form and join trade unions, with some restrictions for members of the armed forces or police. The main trade union is the Confederation of Trade Unions of Armenia (CTUA).

Media agencies 
Media organisations in Armenia include the Journalists Union of Armenia, Yerevan Press Club (YPC), the Association of Investigative Journalists (HETQ) and the All Armenian Mass Media Association (Mediaforum).

NGOs active in the media field in Armenia include the Committee to Protect Freedom of Expression.

Regulatory authorities 
The regulatory authority for the media sector is the Ministry of Communication of Armenia.

Broadcast media require licenses from the National Commission on Television and Radio (NCTR), which is composed of 8 members (4 appointed by the President, 4 by the Parliament) for a 6-years mandate. The licensing systems hinders media freedom and diversity. Print and online media are exempt from licenses.

Censorship and media freedom

While the media has a degree of independence, the freedom of press in Armenia is limited. Some independent channels, such as A1+, Noyan Tapan, and Russian NTV, have had their frequencies taken away by the government. Journalists covering a demonstration against President Robert Kocharyan were attacked when police intervened to detain the protestors in 2005.

In January 2011, the Committee to Protect Journalists – international media watchdog – criticized the Armenian government for maintaining a tight grip on the country's broadcast media and accused them of routinely harassing local journalists challenging them. According to the CPJ report, new amendments to Armenian broadcasting law in 2010 positioned President Sarkisian "to maintain control over the country's docile television and radio stations, most of which were owned by pro-government politicians and businessmen." The report also claims that the Armenian police officers "routinely harassed, assaulted, and arrested journalists" in 2010. "Prosecutors regularly colluded in this practice by failing to investigate police officers, even filing charges on occasion against journalists who protested abuses, CPJ research showed."

Following the 2008 Armenian presidential election protests, President Kocharian controversially declared a 20-day State of Emergency on March 1, and used it to ban all public gatherings and censor all media (both Internet and in print) to include only information sponsored by the state. Also, the authorities closed several opposition newspapers along with their websites, including A1+ and Haykakan Zhamanak. Furthermore, the government blocked access to the YouTube website which contained videos from the March 1 protest and late night clashes with police that showed special forces firing automatic weapons directly into the crowd. Also blocked was the radio transmission and website access to Armenian Liberty, a service of Radio Free Europe.

Attacks and threats against journalists

Frequent attacks on journalists of non-state sponsored media is a serious threat to Armenia's press freedom. The number of assaults has recently declined, but the physical integrity of journalists remain at stake. Nine attacks were reported in 2014 by the Committee to Protect Freedom of Expression (they were 10 in 2013 and 4 in 2012).

 On November 17, 2008, Edik Baghdasaryan, Armenia's most prominent investigative journalist and editor of Hetq, was violently attacked and sustained a severe head injury for which he had to be hospitalized. The attack was likely connected to his reporting.
 In 2009, unresolved cases of violence against journalists included those of Lusine Barseghyan from the opposition newspaper Haykakan Zhamanak; Hrach Melkumyan, the acting Chief of Radio Free Europe/Radio Liberty's Yerevan bureau; and Edik Baghdasaryan, the Chairman of the Investigative Journalists' Association.
 On April 30, 2009, Argishti Kiviryan, a coordinator of the ARMENIA Today news agency (a paper known for its opposition stance), was severely beaten on his way home from work in Yerevan. Three unknown individuals reportedly assailed and severely beat Kiviryan causing him serious head and face injuries. His condition was reported as "serious but stable" after he was taken to the Erebuni medical center. The Human Rights Defender of Armenia, Armen Harutyunyan, condemned the act and, noting that almost all cases of violence against the journalists taken part in the past have not been disclosed, called upon the police to investigate and disclose his assailants.
 Several journalists were attacked during the campaign for the Armenian presidential election, 2013, some of them having their equipment damaged or seized. Nobody was prosecuted by the police, due to "lack of evidence".
 In December 2013, Vardan Minasyan, a journalist with the newspaper Hraparak, was detained and assaulted by police officers while covering a public demonstration in Yerevan.
 In February 2014, Ani and Sarkis Gevorkyan, journalists with Chorrord Ishkhanutyun and iLur.am were assaulted and later detained by the police during an opposition demonstration. The case, raised to the Armenian authorities b the OSCE RFoM, was dropped. Gevorkyan's later appeal was dismissed.
The A1+ journalist Marine Khachatryan suffered an attack in September 2014, but notwithstanding the call by the OSCE RFoM the Armenian Special Investigative Service refused to open a criminal case.
 In September 2014 a Haykakan Zhamanak journalist  had her recorder and photocamera seized by the Head of the Armenian diaspora in Kazakhstan after questioning at a public event in Yerevan. The official then ordered his bodyguards to remove her from the premises.
 In June 2015 journalists from different media outlets (including Radio Azatutyun (RFE/RL), Hetq.am, Gala TV, Haykakan Zhamanak, News.am, PanArmenian.net, Epress.am, 1in.am, and ArmTimes.com) suffered physical attacks, verbal abuse and mistreatment by the police while covering public demonstrations in Yerevan. Some of them had their equipment seized or damaged.
 At least three journalists were obstructed or assaulted, in the period leading to the Armenian constitutional referendum, 2015.

Political interferences
The committee to Protect Freedom of Expression (CPFE) reported 43 cases of pressure on media workers in 2014 (57 in 2013).
The government control the main broadcast media and, for this reason, self-censorship is widespread.
 In 2007 the television station Gala broadcast a speech by an opposition presidential candidate. Since then, the government asked the station to change transmitter and they did not receive a new digital licence.
 In Mary 2015 Armenia's prosecutor-general warned journalists that reporting on ongoing investigations without prior authorization would constitute a crime.
In July 2015 two media outlets, the Hraparak newspaper and Ilur.am news portal, were ordered by Armenian courts to disclose their confidential sources. Journalists were later charged for failing to comply with a court order. The situation was denounced by the OSCE RFoM.

Civil defamation lawsuits
In 2010, the criminal liability for defamation was eliminated. In 2011 the Constitutional Court ruled that "critical assessment of facts" and "evaluation judgments" cannot be charged for defamation.

Civil defamation is still used by politicians and businessmen to put pressure on the media since high fines are foreseen – deemed disproportionate by the OSCE RFoM. Almost 30 lawsuits were counted between May 2010 and November 2011. The NGO Committee to Protect Freedom of Expression (CPFE) had counted 17 civil defamation lawsuits against media workers in 2014.

In 2011 a lawyer sued the Hraparak newspaper for €34,000 in damages for allegedly slanderous readers’ comments. A Yerevan court ordered the seizure of the newspaper's properties as an interim measure pending the final decision. The OSCE RFoM denounced the judgement, and recalled that "compensation... should be proportional to actual damages and should not lead to the closure of a news outlet".

Internet censorship and surveillance

Armenia is listed as engaged in substantial filtering in the political area and selective filtering in the social, conflict/security, and Internet tools areas by the OpenNet Initiative (ONI) in November 2010.

Access to the Internet in Armenia is largely unfettered, although evidence of second and third-generation filtering is mounting. Armenia's political climate is volatile and largely unpredictable. In times of political unrest, the government has not hesitated to put in place restrictions on the Internet as a means to curtail public protest and discontent. According to Article 11 of the Law of the Republic of Armenia on Police, law enforcement has the right to block content to prevent criminal activity.

Armenia's internet access is delivered by Russian providers, occasionally resulting in censorship by Russian ISPs. In 2012 Russian authorities blocked kavkazcenter.com, resulting in it being blocked in Armenia. In 2014 five other websites were blocked due to filtering by the Russian telecommunications regulator Roskomnadzor. ISPs claimed the blocks were due to technical error and were removed.

Media ownership

Transparency

Transparency of media ownership refers to the public availability of accurate, comprehensive and up-to-date information about media ownership structures. A legal regime guaranteeing transparency of media ownership makes possible for the public as well as for media authorities to find out who effectively owns, controls and influences the media as well as media influence on political parties or state bodies.

Transparency of media ownership in Armenia is regulated in the 2003 Law on the Mass Media, which obliges print media to publish data regarding ownership structures and management. The law does not cover digital media, which were created and widely developed later.

The law, amended in June 2010, stipulates that the following entities cannot be founders of private television and radio broadcasting companies: state and local public agencies, member of the Council of the Public Television and Radio Company, members of the Nation Commission for Television and Radio (NCTR), political parties, religious organisations, the president, members of the government, members of the National Assembly and judges, and persons "affiliated with them", as defined in the amended law.

Information about beneficial ownership is inaccessible to the public.
 
In 2015 Liana Sayadyab, the Head of the Armenian Section of the Association of European Journalists proposed the reform of the law: the proposed amendment aims at including within the scope of the law digital media as well, obliging this kind of media outlets to disclose the same ownership information required to print media.

Concentration and pluralism
Media outlets in Armenia are many and diverse, and law against concentration exist. However, law are bypassed and there are concentration problems. The passage from analog to digital broadcasting was particularly damaging for media pluralism.

Legal framework
A new broadcast law (On Television and Radio Broadcasting) was adopted in June 2010. The law prohibits ownership of more than one channel in the same area of broadcasting.

The law limits the broadcast of programmes produced in foreign countries:

Practice
According to a report by the local chapter of Transparency International media in Armenia are diverse, but television stations are controlled by the state or wealthy business. In practice the law is not fully respected. E.g. Panarmenian Media Group (formerly CS Media) owns Armenia TV, Armnews, ATV and formerly TV5.

It is difficult to know who the media owners really are, but often they are politicians or well-known businesspeople (often affiliated with political groups), that then influences media editorial policy. According to most experts media are not considered as business per se. Concentration limits circulation of information and ideas.

Public media
The state had a monopoly in the media market until the early 2000s. Currently the public television owns four channels, one of which is satellite. According to an IREX report they "have acted consistently as a quite obedient tool in the hands of authorities".

Public radio is composed of four radio stations. According to IREX it "represents what could be considered a model public media outlet, allowing for a wide spectrum of views and opinions and providing balanced, impartial, and neutral coverage", but its audience is limited.

In 2014 Soviet-era cable radio was terminated, particularly affecting old people who had this kind of radio in the kitchen.

Advertising
Commercial advertising is prohibited on the public television. For 12 years (2002–2014) advertising of strong alcoholic beverages was prohibited on radio and TV.

The Great Recession reached Armenia later than other countries but strongly, slowing down the development of the media and advertising industry somewhere around 2014. The reduction of commercial advertising was partially compensated by political advertising.

Passage from analog to digital broadcasting
The broadcast law has been criticized by Dunja Mijatovic, OSCE Representative on Freedom of the Media, for not promoting broadcast pluralism in the digital era. Passage from analog to digital broadcasting was originally scheduled for completion in 2015, but doubts were expressed that the deadline could be respected.

The transition allowed only one digital broadcasting license for each of the 10 provinces. This was criticized by independent experts because it would force dozens of regional stations to close, thus reducing the plurality of regional media.

Moreover, the law did not envisaged private regional Multiplex, allowing only national ones, that require large investments.

Lobbying by media and media support organizations was temporary successful: in December 2015 the parliament approved a bill allowing regional stations to continue analog broadcasting within their communities. Officials cited as a reason the need to provide digital television adapters to low-income households.

Experts considered this not as a viable long-term solution. In fact, the switch off was postponed more than once until October 26, 2016, and 11 regional TV companies were forced to close.

See also

 Censorship in Armenia
 Human rights in Armenia
 Media freedom in Armenia
 Transparency of media ownership in Europe

References

External links 

 
Armenia
Armenia
Armenia